The 2015 FIS Freestyle Ski and Snowboarding World Championships were held in Kreischberg, Austria from January 15–25, 2015. In 2014, the FIS (International Ski Federation) decided to merge the FIS Freestyle World Ski Championships with the FIS Snowboarding World Championships starting with these championships. The Austrian municipality of Kreischberg was awarded the event in 2010.

Qualification for the women's aerials event began a day before the opening ceremony. Freestyle skiers competed in six disciplines: moguls, dual moguls, ski cross, slopestyle, halfpipe and aerials. Snowboarders competed in six disciplines: halfpipe, slopestyle, parallel slalom, parallel giant slalom, big air and snowboard cross.

Schedule

Medalists

Freestyle skiing

Men's events

Women's events

Snowboarding

Men's events

Women's events

Participating countries
A total of 40 countries entered athletes.

Medal table

Broadcasting
This was the first time the championships were available for live viewing on YouTube for free of charge, in countries where broadcasting agreements were not in place.

References

External links
 Official website 

 
2015
2015 in freestyle skiing
2015
2015 in snowboarding
2015 in Austrian sport
International sports competitions hosted by Austria
Freestyle skiing competitions in Austria
January 2015 sports events in Europe